Thorsten Schmitt (born September 20, 1975 in Villingen-Schwenningen, Baden-Württemberg) is a German nordic combined skier who has been competing since 1998. He won a silver medal in the 4 x 5 km team event at the 2003 FIS Nordic World Ski Championships in Val di Fiemme.

Schmitt competed in the 1998 Winter Olympics in Nagano, finishing sixth in the 4 x 5 km team event.

Schmitt's lone individual victory occurred in 1998 in a 15 km individual event in Germany.

References

External links 
  
 
 

1975 births
Living people
People from Villingen-Schwenningen
Sportspeople from Freiburg (region)
Nordic combined skiers at the 1998 Winter Olympics
German male Nordic combined skiers
FIS Nordic World Ski Championships medalists in Nordic combined